The Battle of the Boarn was an eighth century battle between the Franks and the Frisians near the mouth of the river Boarn in what is now the Dutch province of Friesland.

Battle 

In 734 a Frankish army commanded by Majordomo Charles Martel invaded Friesland in a campaign that was part of a series of ongoing wars and skirmishes between the Franks and the Frisians. Marching along the river Boarn the Frankish army reached the mouth of the river where it used to flow into the Bordine estuary or Middelsee. This estuary has since silted up and was claimed for agriculture during the 10th to 14th century.

The Frisians commanded by King Poppo used boats to land their army and surprise the Franks. However, the Frisian army was beaten and Poppo killed. The Franks gained control of the Frisian lands west of the Lauwers estuary and the Frisians became vassals of the Franks apart from the tribes living in East Frisia in present-day Germany.

References

Bibliography 
, Liber Historiae Francorum

Boarn
Boarn
the Boarn
734
8th century in Francia